Queen's Park Women are a Scottish women's football team based in Glasgow, associated with the men's professional team Queen's Park. They were formed in 1999 as Wellpark before changing to their current name in 2002. They currently play in Scottish Women's Premier League 2, the second tier of the national league system. The team play their home matches at Lesser Hampden.

Squad

Technical staff

Honours
 Scottish Women's Football League: 2013
 SWFL Cup: 2012
 Scottish Women's Cup: Runners-up 2003–04
 SWPL Cup: Runners-up 2007–08

See also
 :Category:Queen's Park F.C. (women) players

References

External links
Women's team at Queen's Park F.C.

Women
Women's football clubs in Scotland
Football clubs in Glasgow
Scottish Women's Premier League clubs
Scottish Women's Football League clubs